Garmanjan (Romanized as Garmanjān; also known as Garamenjān) is a village in the Dehqanan Rural District, in the Central District of Kharameh County, in Fars Province, Iran. For the census of 2006, the population was 379, in 108 families.

References

Populated places in Kharameh County